Fumio Nagakubo (born 23 February 1937) is a Japanese speed skater. He competed at the 1960 Winter Olympics and the 1964 Winter Olympics.

References

1937 births
Living people
Japanese male speed skaters
Olympic speed skaters of Japan
Speed skaters at the 1960 Winter Olympics
Speed skaters at the 1964 Winter Olympics
Sportspeople from Yamanashi Prefecture